The Hugo Award for Best Related Work is one of the Hugo Awards given each year for primarily non-fiction works related to science fiction or fantasy, published or translated into English during the previous calendar year. The Hugo Awards have been described as "a fine showcase for speculative fiction" and "the best known literary award for science fiction writing".

It was originally titled the Hugo Award for Best Non-Fiction Book and was first awarded in 1980. In 1999 the Award was retitled to the Hugo Award for Best Related Book, and eligibility was officially expanded to fiction works that were primarily noteworthy for reasons besides their fictional aspects. In 2010, the title of the award was again changed, to the Hugo Award for Best Related Work. In addition to the regular Hugo awards, beginning in 1996 Retrospective Hugo Awards, or "Retro Hugos", have been available to be awarded for years 50, 75, or 100 years prior in which no awards were given. The Retro Best Related Work Hugo was awarded for 1954, 50 years later, but had not been awarded for any other year due to insufficient nominations, eventually reappearing in 2020 for 1945.

During the 45 nomination years, 236 individuals and 1 organization have had works nominated; 56 people and 1 organization have won, including co-authors and Retro Hugos. John Clute has won four times; once by himself, once with John Grant as a co-author, once with Peter Nicholls, and once with Nicholls, David Langford, and Graham Sleight. Nicholls has won a third time, and Grant has won a second time, sharing the award with his co-authors Elizabeth L. Humphrey and Pamela D. Scoville. Thomas Disch and Ursula K. Le Guin have also won twice, both without co-authors; no other author has won more than once. The Organization for Transformative Works was the organization that won, for its Archive of Our Own fanwork repository. Cathy and Arnie Fenner have been nominated eight times for their work on writing and editing the Spectrum: The Best In Contemporary Fantastic Art series, both the most nominations received by any author/editor and the most nominations without winning. Clute has been nominated seven times and Farah Mendlesohn seven times with one win; Le Guin five times with two wins; Isaac Asimov and Langford four times with one win; and Mike Resnick four times with no wins. The Writing Excuses team, consisting of Brandon Sanderson, Dan Wells, Howard Tayler, Mary Robinette Kowal, and Jordan Sanderson, have been nominated four times and won once. Seven other authors have been nominated three times. Many of these writers, editors, and artists have won Hugos in other categories, from Fan Writer to Best Novel.

Selection
Hugo Award nominees and winners are chosen by supporting or attending members of the annual non-profit World Science Fiction Convention, or Worldcon, and the presentation evening constitutes its central event. The selection process is defined in the World Science Fiction Society Constitution as instant-runoff voting with six nominees, except in the case of a tie. The works on the ballot are the six most-nominated by members that year, with no limit on the number of works that can be nominated. Initial nominations are made by members in January through March, while voting on the ballot of six nominations is performed roughly in April through July, subject to change depending on when that year's Worldcon is held. Prior to 2017, the final ballot was five works; it was changed that year to six, with each initial nominator limited to five nominations. Worldcons are generally held near the start of September, and are held in a different city around the world each year. Members are permitted to vote "no award", if they feel that none of the nominees is deserving of the award that year, and in the case that "no award" takes the majority the Hugo is not given in that category. This happened in the Best Related Work category in 2015 and 2016.

Winners and nominees 
In the following table, the years correspond to the date of the ceremony, rather than when the work was first published. Each date links to the "year in literature" article corresponding with when the work was eligible. Entries with a blue background and an asterisk (*) next to the author's name have won the award; those with a white background are the nominees on the short-list.

  *   Winners and joint winners
  +   No winner selected

Retro Hugos
Beginning with the 1996 Worldcon, the World Science Fiction Society created the concept of "Retro Hugos", in which the Hugo award could be retroactively awarded for 50, 75, or 100 years prior. Retro Hugos may only be awarded for years after 1939 in which no awards were originally given. The Hugo Award for Best Related Work has only been retroactively awarded twice, in 2004 and 2020; all other years it was not on the ballot or was dropped due to insufficient response.

Notes

References

External links
Hugo Awards official site

Related Work